Walter Nesbitt "Neb" Stewart (May 21, 1918 – June 8, 1990) was a Major League Baseball left fielder who played for the Philadelphia Phillies in .

External links 

1918 births
1990 deaths
Philadelphia Phillies players
Major League Baseball left fielders
Baseball players from Ohio
People from Clark County, Ohio
Sanford Spinners players